Karetu River may refer to:

 Karetu River (Canterbury), South Island, New Zealand
 Karetu River (Northland), in Karetu, North Island, New Zealand